Wu Jianqiu (born 1962) is a retired female badminton player from China.

Career
Wu was one of China's leading combination women's singles and doubles players in the first several years after her country joined the International Badminton Federation (now Badminton World Federation). She won the Danish Open women's singles in 1982 (the first of the two Danish Opens that were played that year). In 1983 she won the prestigious All-England Open women's doubles title with Xu Rong and was runner-up in the singles to fellow countrywoman Zhang Ailing. She also earned a bronze medal in women's doubles with Xu Rong at the 1983 IBF World Championships. In 1985 she won the Japan Open and a silver medal at the IBF World Championships (defeating the great Li Lingwei in the semifinals) in women's singles. Wu was a member of Chinese Uber Cup (women's international) teams which won world team championships in both 1984 and 1986.

Achievements

World Championships 
Women's singles

Women's doubles

World Cup 
Women's singles

Women's doubles

Open tournaments 
Women's singles

Women's doubles

IBF World Grand Prix 
The World Badminton Grand Prix sanctioned by International Badminton Federation (IBF) from 1983 to 2006.

Women's singles

Women's doubles

External links
All England champions 1899-2007

Chinese female badminton players
Living people
1962 births
Asian Games medalists in badminton
Badminton players at the 1986 Asian Games
Badminton players from Jiangsu
Badminton players at the 1982 Asian Games
Asian Games gold medalists for China
Medalists at the 1982 Asian Games
Medalists at the 1986 Asian Games